Trump Islands are located in Notre Dame Bay, within census division No. 8, Newfoundland and Labrador, Canada.

The uninhabited islands are noted for their mineral wealth.

Description
The Trump Islands are two uninhabited islands, North Trump Island and South Trump Island, located on the western side of Friday Bay, within the larger Notre Dame Bay.  The two islands are surrounded by several small islets, and are separated from each other by Trump Island Tickle, a rock-and-islet-filled channel.

Small vessels can anchor at Fools Harbour, at the eastern end of South Trump Island.

History
Exploration of the Trump Islands did not occur until the 1860s.  Fishing is poor, and the islands are surrounded by rocks, making them difficult to reach by boat.

Chalcopyrite and high-grade copper-cobalt ore were found on the islands in 1863.  In 1999, gold, pyrite, pyrrhotite, silver, and sulphide were also found.  In 2017, King's Bay Resources acquired mining rights to most of North Trump Island.

References

Uninhabited islands of Newfoundland and Labrador